Betacetylmethadol is a synthetic opioid. It is a diastereoisomer of alphacetylmethadol (as well as levacetylmethadol). In the United States, betacetylmethadol is a Schedule I drug Narcotic under the Controlled Substances Act, with an ACSCN of 9607 and a 2 gramme manufacturing quota as of 2014.

See also
 Acetylmethadol
 Alphacetylmethadol
 Levacetylmethadol
 Betamethadol

References

Acetate esters
Dimethylamino compounds
Analgesics
Mu-opioid receptor agonists
Synthetic opioids